List of cyberattacks on schools From 2016 to 2019 there have been 855 cyberattacks on U.S. School districts. Microsoft Security Intelligence has said there are more attacks on schools and school districts than any other industry. There were 348 reported cyberattacks on school districts in 2019. School districts are allocating millions of dollars for their computer systems to support virtual learning in the wake of the COVID-19 pandemic. The Miami-Dade Public Schools invested in a $15.3 million online learning system. In 2020 their system was hacked with a Denial of Service Cyber attack.

The two main types of cyberattacks on schools are Distributed denial of service DDoS - an attack which overwhelms the targets internet bandwidth, and Ransomware - where the hacker takes control of the target's computer system and demands money. In 2020 because of reliance on distance learning, schools braced for cyberattacks. The average cost for organizations that do not pay the ransomware demands was $730,000.

Legislation
U.S. Representative Josh Harder introduced a bill in congress entitled: Protecting Students from Cybercrimes Act. The bill's goal is to give schools $25 million in grants to implement cyber security. In 2019 U.S. Senators Gary Peters and Rick Scott also authored a bill to safeguard school computer systems. The bill is called The K-12 Cybersecurity Act.

Cyberattacks on schools alphabetical

A 
Allegheny County Schools (NC) ransomeware attack
Athens Independent School District (Texas) ransomware attack

B
Burke County Public Schools (NC) ransomeware attack
Baugo Community Schools (Indiana) cyberattack

C
Conejo Valley Unified school district (California) DDoS
Cherry Hill School District Philadelphia malware attack

D

E

F

G
Gadsden Independent School District (Sunland Park NM) ransomware attack

H
Hartford Public Schools ransomware attack
Hamden school district (Connecticut) malware attack
Haywood County Schools ransomeware attack
Humble Independent School District (Texas) DDoS attack
Huntington Beach Unified High School District (California) ransomeware attack

I

J
Jackson Public School District (Mississippi) malware attack
Jay Public School District (Oklahoma) virus

K
King George County Schools ransomware attack

L
Lumberton Township Public Schools in Burlington County (New Jersey) Zoom malicious pornographic intrusion

M

Madison Public Schools (Connecticut) Zoombombing attack
Miami-Dade Public Schools System cyberattack
Mitchell County Schools (North Carolina) ransomware attack
The Mountain View-Los Altos High School District (California) ransomware attack

N
Community School Corporation of New Palestine Indiana (DDoS) cyberattack

O

P
Penncrest School District (Pennsylvania) ransomware attack (paid $10,000)
Pittsburg Unified School District of Pennsylvania ransomeware attack
Ponca City Public Schools (Oklahoma) ransomware attack

Q

R
Richmond school district (Michigan) ransomware attack

S
Surry County Schools ransomeware attack
South Adams Schools (Indiana) ransomware attack
Southern Hancock School District (Indiana) DDoS attack
St. Landry Parish schools (Louisiana) malware attack

T
Toledo Public School district (Ohio) cyberattack

U

V
Ventura Unified school district (California) DDoS

W

X

Y

Z

Colleges
Capital University Law School in (Columbus, Ohio)
Columbia College Chicago ransomware attack
Michigan State University ransomware attack
New Mexico State University and the school's foundation virus
Regis University (Denver Colorado) ransomware attack paid ransom.
University of California at San Francisco School of Medicine ransomware attack paid 1.14 million
University of New Mexico School of Law (Albuquerque NM)
Wallace State Community College (Alabama) virus

See also

References

Cyberattacks
Lists of school-related attacks